Kneifel is a surname. Notable people with the surname include:

 Chris Kneifel (born 1961), American racing driver
 Gottfried Kneifel (born 1948), Austrian politician
 Hans Kneifel (1936–2012), German author
 Josef Kneifel (born 1942), German political prisoner

See also
 Alexander Knaifel (born 1943), Russian composer